UNISoN is a Java application that can download Usenet messages from free NNTP servers, show the saved messages, then allow filtering of data to save to a Pajek network file or CSV file. It creates networks using the author of each post. If someone replies to a post, there is a unidirectional link created from the author of the post to the author of the message they are replying to. There is also a preview panel that shows the network visually. It was developed in 2008 as part of an MSc Business Systems Analysis & Design at City University London. and was released as Freeware. In 2016 the code was made Open Source.

Release history
The first version of UNISoN was released in February, 2008. There was an update to the project Website in 2012 which added Java Web Start. In 2016 there was some work to update the code and documentation.

See also
Social network analysis software

References 

Usenet clients
Data analysis software